Jabal Amil, also spelled Jabal Amel and historically known as Jabal Amila, is a cultural and geographic region in Southern Lebanon largely associated with its long-established, predominantly Twelver Shia Muslim inhabitants. Its precise boundaries vary, but it is generally defined as the mostly highland region on either side of the Litani River, between the Mediterranean Sea in the west and the Wadi al-Taym, Beqaa and Hula valleys in the east. 

According to local legend, the Shia community in Jabal Amil is one of the oldest in history, second only to the Shia community of Medina, and were converted to Islam by Abu Dharr al-Ghifari, a companion of the Islamic prophet Muhammad and an early supporter of Ali. Although there is frequent occurrence of this account in many religious sources, it is largely dismissed in academia, and historical sources suggest Shia Islam largely developed in Jabal Amil between the mid-8th to 10th centuries (750–900).

Name
The region derives its name from the Amila, an Arab tribe that had been affiliated with the Ghassanid client kings of Byzantium and that moved into the region and neighboring Galilee after the 7th-century Muslim conquests. Although speculative, Twelver Shia tradition in southern Lebanon credits the Amila as the progenitors of the community, by having sided with the faction of Ali in the mid-7th century.

Geographic definition

Early Muslim geographers' descriptions
The 10th-century Jerusalemite geographer al-Muqaddasi describes 'Jabal Amila' as "a mountainous district" overlooking the Mediterranean sea and connected to Mount Lebanon. It contained "many fine villages" and springs. Its fields were rain-dependent, and grapes, olives, and other fruits were grown there. It was the source of the highest-quality honey in Syria, along with that of Jerusalem. Jabal Amila, and the district of Jabal Jarash to the southeast, on the other side of the Jordan River, were the largest sources of revenue for Tiberias, the capital of Jund al-Urdunn (the Jordan [River] District). He mentions that another highland region, between Tyre, Sidon and Qadas, was known as 'Jabal Siddiqa' after a holy person's tomb in the district that was visited annually by throngs of local pilgrims and Muslim officials. Qadas is also mentioned by him as belonging to Jabal Amila, and being populated by Shia Muslims along others.

The Damascene geographer al-Dimashqi described Jabal Amila in 1300 as a district in the Safad Province characterized by its abundant vineyards and olive, carob and terebinth groves, and populated by Twelver Shia Muslims. He also notes the neighboring highland districts of Jabal Jaba, Jabal Jazin and Jabal Tibnin whose inhabitants were also Twelver Shia and whose lands contained considerable springs, vineyards, and fruit groves. The ruler of Hama and scholar Abu'l-Fida (d. 1341) noted that Jabal Amila "runs down the coast as far south as Tyre and was home to the Shaqif Arnun fortress (Beaufort Castle).

Modern definition
According to the historian Tamara Chalabi, defining Jabal Amil is "difficult" as the region was not generally recognized as a distinct geographic or political entity. Rather, its identity, and by extension its definition, is derived from its largely Twelver Shia Muslim inhabitants, who historically referred to themselves as 'Amilis'. The scholar Marilyn Booth calls it "a terrain of identity, its 'boundaries' somewhat indefinite". In this definition, the region is bound in the west by the Mediterranean Sea and in the east by the valley regions of Wadi al-Taym, the Beqaa, and the Hula. The Litani River cuts the region into northern and southern parts. The southern part is additionally known as Bilad Bishara. 

According to the scholar Chibli Mallat, while the traditional definition of Jabal Amil includes the cities of Sidon and Jezzine, other, more limited definitions exclude them, defining them as separate areas. The traditional definition also includes parts of modern Israel, including the former villages of al-Bassa and al-Khalisa, and the villages of Tarbikha, Qadas, Hunin, al-Nabi Yusha', and Saliha, whose inhabitants had been Twelver Shia before their depopulation in the 1948 Palestine war. In the definition of Lebanon specialist Elisabeth Picard, the northern boundary of Jabal Amil is formed by the Zahrani River, south of Sidon. The historian William Harris defines it as the hills south of the Litani, which "grade into the Upper Galilee". According to Stefan Winter, Jabal Amil is traditionally defined as the predominantly Twelver Shia-populated, highland region southeast of Sidon. A prominent native scholar of Jabal Amil, Suleiman Dahir, defined it in 1930 as a much larger area, encompassing Jezzine in the Chouf, Baalbek in the northern Beqaa, and the Hula.

History

Notable residents 
 Twelver Shia scholar, Al-Hurr al-Amili (1624–1693)
 Nuclear physicist, Rammal Hassan Rammal (1951–1991) 
 Cardinal, Anthony Peter Khoraish (1907–1994)
 Shi'a Islamic scholar, Abd al-Husayn Sharaf al-Din al-Musawi (1872–1957)
 Ottoman-era Shia leader from El Assaad Family, Nasif al-Nassar (d. 1781)
 Secretary General of Hezbollah, Hassan Nasrallah
 Scientist, Hassan Kamel Al-Sabbah (1894–1935)
 Shi'a Islamic Poet and Scholar Sheikh Bahaddin al-Amili (1547 – 1621)

References

Bibliography

Further reading

Regions of Lebanon
Shia Islam in Lebanon